Cutaneous horns, also known by the Latin name cornu cutaneum, are unusual keratinous skin tumors with the appearance of horns, or sometimes of wood or coral. Formally, this is a clinical diagnosis for a "conical projection above the surface of the skin." They are usually small and localized but can, in very rare cases, be much larger. Although often benign, they can also be malignant or premalignant.

Signs and symptoms
The lesion at the base of the keratin mound is benign in the majority of cases. Malignancy is present in up to 20% of cases, with squamous-cell carcinoma being the most common type. The incidence of squamous-cell carcinoma increases to 37% when the cutaneous horn is present on the penis.
Tenderness at the base of the lesion often suggests the presence of a possible underlying squamous-cell carcinoma.

Cause
The cause of cutaneous horns is still unknown, but it is believed that exposure to radiation can trigger the condition. This is evidenced by a higher rate of cases occurring on the face and hands, areas that are often exposed to sunlight. Moreover, there is a higher prevalence in Asian countries with a warm climate. Other cases have reported cutaneous horns arising from burn scars. As with many other wart-like skin conditions, a link to the HPV virus family, especially the HPV-2 subtype has been suggested.

Diagnosis
Cutaneous horn usually arises due to an underlying epidermal lesion, the most common being verruca vulgaris (wart), actinic keratosis (a potentially pre-malignant lesion of dysplastic keratinocytes), or squamous cell carcinoma (a form of skin cancer). These can look essentially identical clinically. The only reliable way to diagnose which type of lesion is present under the horn is to biopsy the lesion and have it microscopically examined by a pathologist (or dermatologist).

Treatments
As the horn is composed of keratin, the same material found in fingernails, the horn can usually be removed with a sterile razor. However, the underlying condition will still need to be treated. Treatments vary, but they can include surgery, radiation therapy, and chemotherapy.

Notable cases
 Zhang Ruifang, aged 101 (as of 2010), living in Linlou Village, Henan province, China, has grown a cutaneous horn on her forehead, resembling what those who have examined her and her family call "Devil's Horns." Another is forming on the opposite side of her forehead.
 Liang Xiuzhen, aged 87 (as of 2015) living in Guiyan village in Ziyang City, Sichuan province, China, grew a  pointed horn from her forehead, earning her the nickname "Unicorn Woman".
 Huang Yuanfan, aged 84 (living in Ziyuan, China).
 Shyam Lal Yadav, aged 74 (living in Madhya Pradesh, India) grew a  horn after an accident, he later got it surgically removed.
 Madame Dimanche, called Widow Sunday, a French woman living in Paris in the early 19th century, grew a  horn from her forehead in six years from the age of 76 before it was successfully removed by French surgeon Br. Joseph Souberbeille (1754–1846). A wax model of her head is on display at the Mütter Museum, The College of Physicians of Philadelphia, US.
The Shope papilloma virus can cause rabbits to grow horns. This may have been the source of myths such as the Wolpertinger and the Jackalope.

See also
 Wart
 Actinic keratosis
 Epidermodysplasia verruciformis
 List of cutaneous conditions

References

Further reading 
 
 
 DiClaudio, Dennis (2006) "The Hypochondriac's Pocket Guide to Horrible Diseases You Probably Already Have", Bloomsbury Publishing,

External links 

Epidermal nevi, neoplasms, and cysts